The West Virginia Sports Hall of Fame is an athletics hall of fame in the U.S. state of West Virginia. The inductees are selected by the West Virginia Sports Writers Association.

References

Sports in West Virginia
All-sports halls of fame
State sports halls of fame in the United States
Halls of fame in West Virginia